Király Bath or Király fürdő is a thermal bath that was first built in Hungary in the second half of the sixteenth century, during the time of Ottoman rule. The bath and its neighborhood have since become part of the consolidated city of Budapest.

It still retains many of the key elements of a Turkish bath, exemplified by its Turkish dome and octagonal pool. It is located at the corner of Fő utca and Ganz utca. Its address and entrance is Fő utca 82-84 (green façade on the picture to the right) while the exterior of the bath proper is on Ganz utca (domed stone structure).

Components of thermal water include sodium, calcium, magnesium bicarbonate, sulphate-chloride and a significant amount of fluoride ion. The water temperature in the four different pools have some difference, but in between 26 and 40 ℃.

The Király Baths are open to both sexes.

Notes

External links
Budapest Spas and Hot Springs entry on Kiraly Baths
Review of the Kiraly Bath
Pictures of Kiraly Baths on the same site

Infrastructure completed in the 16th century
Ottoman architecture in Hungary
Thermal baths in Budapest